Piotrków Voivodeship was a voivodeship, or unit of administrative division and local government, in Poland from 1975 to 1998, superseded by Łódź Voivodeship. Its capital city was Piotrków Trybunalski.

Major cities and towns (population in 1995)
 Piotrków Trybunalski (81,100)
 Tomaszów Mazowiecki (70,000)
 Bełchatów (59,900)
 Radomsko (51,100)
 Opoczno (21,900)

See also
 Voivodeships of Poland

Former voivodeships of Poland (1975–1998)